The Gin Nomad is a South Korean single-place, paraglider that was designed by Gin Seok Song and produced by Gin Gliders of Yongin. It is now out of production.

Design and development
The Nomad was designed as an intermediate performance glider. The models are each named for their relative size.

Variants
Nomad S
Small-sized model for lighter pilots. The glider model is DHV 2-3 certified.
Nomad M
Mid-sized model for medium-weight pilots. The glider model is DHV 2-3 certified.
Nomad L
Large-sized model for heavier pilots. The glider model is DHV 2-3 certified.

Specifications (Nomad L)

References

Nomad
Paragliders